West Delhi is one of the 11 administrative districts of the National Capital Territory of Delhi in India. Administratively, the district is divided into three subdivisions, Patel Nagar, Rajouri Garden and Punjabi Bagh.West Delhi is bound by the districts of North West Delhi to the north, North Delhi and Central Delhi to the east, South West Delhi to the south, and Jhajjar District of Haryana state to the west. Major residential and commercial areas of Delhi like Janakpuri and Tilak Nagar are located in West Delhi.

West Delhi has an area of 129 km², with a population density of nearly 14,000 persons per km². The population of 2,543,243 consists of 1,356,240 males and 1,187,003 females. Children between 0–6 years are 203,528 consisting of 109,526 boys and 94,002 girls. The literacy rate is above 70% at a total of 1,301,252 of which 739,572 are males and 561,680 females.

Demographics
According to the 2011 census West Delhi has a population of 2,543,243, roughly equal to the nation of Kuwait or the US state of Nevada. This gives it a ranking of 169th in India (out of a total of 640). Its population growth rate over the decade 2001-2011 was  18.91%. West Delhi has a sex ratio of 876 females for every 1000 males, and a literacy rate of 87.12%. 2,536,823 (99.75%) of the population lives in urban areas. Scheduled Castes make up 14.80% of the population.

At the time of the 2011 census, 75.46% of the population spoke Hindi, 14.52% Punjabi, 1.66% Bhojpuri 1.32% Urdu and 1.06% Rajasthani as their first language.

See also
 Districts of Delhi
 Bali Nagar
 Meera Bagh
 Najafgarh
 Indira Gandhi International Airport
 Ashok Nagar (Delhi)
 Tilak Nagar
 Janakpuri
 Vikaspuri
 Paschim Vihar
 Punjabi Bagh
 NANGLOI
 Rajouri Garden
Mayapuri
 Chander Vihar

 Patel Nagar
 Dwarka
 Dashrath puri
 South Delhi
 Hari Nagar
 Subhash Nagar
 Uttam Nagar
 Shadipur Depot (Baljit Nagar, Kathputli Colony)
 Naraina Ind. Area
 Kirti Nagar
 Saraswati Garden
 Mansarover Garden

References

External links

 West Delhi District official website

Districts of Delhi